Thomas Carmoy (born 16 February 2000) is a Belgian high jumper. He won the bronze medal in the men's high jump at the 2021 European Athletics Indoor Championships held in Toruń, Poland.

In 2019, he won the bronze medal in his event at the Military World Games held in Wuhan, China.

International competitions

References

External links 
 

Living people
2000 births
Sportspeople from Charleroi
Belgian male high jumpers
Belgian Athletics Championships winners
21st-century Belgian people